is the pseudonym of , a well-known director of anime. He works frequently with the animation studio Madhouse (which he co-founded), though he is a freelance director not employed directly by any one studio. He began working in the animation industry—at age 17—as an in-between animator on the 1958 film Hakujaden. His works have won and been nominated for multiple awards, including a nomination for Best Film (Metropolis) at the 2001 Festival de Cine de Sitges.

Rintaro is a fan of science fiction, and has been influenced by American westerns, gangster films, film noir, and French films. Additionally, he was influenced by Osamu Tezuka, and worked with him on Kimba the White Lion and Astro Boy. He said that when he was making Metropolis, which was based on Tezuka's manga of the same name, he "wanted to communicate Tezuka's spirit". Rintaro personally introduced the film at the Big Apple Anime Fest in 2001, where it was screened before its theatrical release by TriStar Pictures.

Rintaro has also worked under the name Kuruma Hino, in addition to his best known pseudonym and his birth name. His pseudonym is sometimes miswritten as Rin Taro or Taro Rin. He is a founding member of the Japanese Animation Creators Association (JAniCA) labor group.

Biography
Rintaro was born in Tokyo. His first job in the animation industry was as an in-between animator on the 1958 film Hakujaden, which he worked on while working at Toei Animation. After working on two additional films there, he began working for Mushi Productions, the studio run by Osamu Tezuka. His first directing job was the fourth episode of the 1963 series Astro Boy. After leaving Mushi in 1971 to become a freelancer, he worked on many TV series and films, and established himself as one of the most respected and well-known anime directors in Japan.

In recent years, Rintaro has lectured at Kyoto Seika University.

Rintaro's brother, Masayuki Hayashi, is himself an anime director and animator with credits including Wandering Sun, Kimba the White Lion, Combattler V and several Tatsunoko productions including Kerokko Demetan, Dash Kappei, The Littl' Bits, and Okawari Boy Starzan S.  Some sources, including The Anime Encyclopedia, erroneously claim that "Masayuki Hayashi" and "Rintaro" are one and the same.

Filmography

Films

Short films

Original Video Animation

TV series

Books
 Galaxy Express 999 movie Storyboard (映画「銀河鉄道999」絵コンテ帳). Fukkan.com , 2019.

References

External links
 
 
 Rintaro page at Madhouse

Anime directors
1941 births
Living people
Madhouse (company) people
Osamu Tezuka
People from Tokyo